C Project is a Japanese UCI Continental cycling team established in 2012.

National champions
2013
 Japan Time Trial Champion, Masatoshi Oba

References

UCI Continental Teams (Asia)
Cycling teams established in 2013
Cycling teams based in Japan